The discography of Japanese singer Mami Kawada consists of four studio albums, one compilation albums, two video albums and sixteen singles. Kawada debuted as a singer as a part of the I've Sound anime and game soundtrack production group, beginning to release music for game and anime soundtracks from 2001. After signing with Geneon Entertainment, Kawada released her debut single "Radiance" in 2005, a split single also featuring fellow I've Sound musician Kotoko's "Chi ni Kaeru (On the Earth)". Kawada released her debut album Seed in 2006.

Studio albums

Compilation albums

Singles

As a collaborating artist

Other appearances

Video albums

Notes

References

Discographies of Japanese artists
Pop music discographies